Jacobus Gronovius a.k.a. Jacob Gronow (10 October 1645 – 21 October 1716) was a Dutch classical scholar.

He was born in Deventer, the son of the German classical scholar Johann Friedrich Gronovius and Aleyda ten Nuyl, and father of the botanist Jan Frederik Gronovius. His family moved to Leiden in 1658 and he married Anna van Vredenburch from Rotterdam on 5 May 1680.

Gronovius is chiefly known as the editor of the Thesaurus antiquitatum Graecarum (1697–1702, in 13 volumes). He died, aged 71, in Leiden.

References

1645 births
1716 deaths
Dutch classical scholars
People from Deventer
Classical scholars of Leiden University